Denis Goavec (born 15 September 1957) is a retired French football midfielder and later manager.

References

External links

 Denis Goavec Interview

1957 births
Living people
Sportspeople from Toulon
French footballers
Association football midfielders
ES Viry-Châtillon players
Stade Brestois 29 players
Blois Football 41 players
FC Montceau Bourgogne players
Stade Briochin players
Ligue 1 players
Ligue 2 players
French football managers
Stade Brestois 29 managers
Angers SCO managers
Vannes OC managers
Stade de Reims managers
Benin national football team managers
AS Vita Club managers
AS Cherbourg Football managers
MC El Eulma managers
JS Saoura managers
AS Kaloum Star managers
French expatriate football managers
Expatriate football managers in Benin
French expatriate sportspeople in Benin
Expatriate football managers in the Democratic Republic of the Congo
French expatriate sportspeople in the Democratic Republic of the Congo
Expatriate football managers in Algeria
French expatriate sportspeople in Algeria
Expatriate football managers in Guinea
French expatriate sportspeople in Guinea
Ligue 2 managers
Linafoot managers
Algerian Ligue Professionnelle 1 managers
Footballers from Provence-Alpes-Côte d'Azur